The 2016 Major League Baseball (MLB) First-Year Player Draft began on June 9, 2016, to assign amateur baseball players to MLB teams.
The draft order is the reverse order of the 2015 MLB season standings.  In addition, compensation picks will be distributed for players who did not sign from the 2015 MLB Draft. The Philadelphia Phillies received the first overall selection. The Los Angeles Dodgers received the 36th pick as compensation for failing to sign Kyle Funkhouser, the 35th overall selection of the 2015 MLB Draft.

Teams from the smallest markets and revenue pools are eligible for competitive balance draft picks. The first six picks, Round A, were determined by lottery between the Arizona Diamondbacks, Colorado Rockies, Cincinnati Reds, Miami Marlins, San Diego Padres, Tampa Bay Rays, Milwaukee Brewers, Cleveland Indians, Oakland Athletics, Pittsburgh Pirates, Kansas City Royals, and St. Louis Cardinals. The six preceding teams that do not receive a pick in Round A were entered into a second lottery, with the Baltimore Orioles, Minnesota Twins, and Seattle Mariners, to receive the six picks in Round B. The twelve competitive balance draft picks are the only picks allowed to be traded. The Reds received the first pick in Round A, followed by the Athletics, Rockies, Diamondbacks, Marlins, and Pirates. The Padres received the first pick of Round B, followed by the Indians, Twins, Brewers, Orioles, and Rays.

First round selections

Compensatory round

Competitive Balance Round A

Other notable selections

Notes
Compensation picks

Trades

References

Major League Baseball draft
Draft
Major League Baseball draft
Major League Baseball draft
Baseball in New Jersey
Events in New Jersey
Sports in Hudson County, New Jersey
Secaucus, New Jersey